The following is a list of Boston University Terriers men's basketball head coaches. The Terriers have had 25 coaches in their 114-season history.

Boston University's current head coach is Joe Jones. He was hired in March 2017 to replace Pat Chambers, who left to take the head coach position at Penn State.

References

Boston University

Boston University Terriers basketball, men's, coaches